Hasanabad-e Karah (also Romanized as Ḩasanābād-e Karah; also known as Kūh Ḩasanābād) is a village in Dowlatabad Rural District, in the Central District of Ravansar County, Kermanshah Province, Iran. At the 2006 census, its population was 213, in 44 families.

References 

Populated places in Ravansar County